Jason Christopher Woodward (born 17 May 1990 in Wellington, New Zealand) is a professional rugby union player who plays for Sale Sharks in the Premiership Rugby.

Early career
Woodward played for the Upper Hutt Premier team, and was a regular in the Upper Hutt Leader. In 2010, Woodward made the New Zealand U20s and represented New Zealand at the IRB Junior World Championship in Argentina, helping the team to win the competition undefeated.

Domestic career

Wellington
Woodward played his first provincial season with the Wellington Lions in 2011. On debut he scored all of Wellington Lions' three tries to beat Taranaki 23–5 in the 2011 season's opening game.

Rebels
Woodward joined the Melbourne Rebels following a strong 2012 ITM Cup campaign with the Wellington Lions. However an injury sustained pre-season delayed his debut until round six of the 2013 Super Rugby season. Woodward made his debut in an unfortunate 64–7 belting from the Sharks in Durban. He started at outside centre. Back in Australia for round eight in Perth, Woodward started on the right wing against the Western Force. He scored his first and second tries in Super Rugby and helped the Rebels win 30–23.

Hurricanes
June 2014, Woodward joined the Hurricanes after signing a two-year deal to return to his home franchise. The then 24-year-old returned to Wellington at the end of the 2014 Super Rugby competition ending a two-season stint with the Melbourne Rebels. Woodward's Super Rugby season would be soon over after he broke his ankle playing club rugby in Wellington. He suffered the injury when he was caught between two defenders while playing at centre for club side Upper Hutt against Oriental Rongotai at the Polo Ground in Miramar. Woodward had been used only sparingly by the Hurricanes throughout the 2015 season with just three appearances, but had been in good form since starting the opening two matches in South Africa against the Lions and Bulls. With Nehe Milner-Skudder and James Marshall also used at fullback, Woodward's only other appearance had been against his former team the Rebels at Westpac Stadium in round seven.

Bristol Rugby
On 12 September 2016 it was announced that Woodward had signed a two-year deal with Aviva Premiership club Bristol Rugby.

Gloucester Rugby
Following Bristol Rugby's relegation at the end of the 2016-17 Aviva Premiership season it was reported Woodward had a relegation clause in his contract, which was reported to be activated by Gloucester Rugby, where Woodward would link up with some of his former Hartpury College friends.

Sale Sharks
After his release from Gloucester, Woodward signed for Premiership rivals Sale Sharks for the 2022-23 season.

International career
In May 2017 he was invited to a training camp with the senior England squad by Eddie Jones.

Personal life
Woodward's father Glen was a loose forward for Hutt Old Boys in the 1980s before arthritis cut his career short, while brothers Aidan and Jared are both making names for themselves with the Upper Hutt Rams. He spent two years in England on exchange at Hartpury College, however he left early to further his rugby career in New Zealand and therefore has no formal qualifications, unlike his sister who is a former New Zealand Fencing Champion and is University educated. He also studied to become a commercial helicopter pilot. In his spare time he enjoys driving monster trucks

References

External links
 Melbourne Rebels Profile
 Hurricanes Profile

1990 births
Living people
New Zealand rugby union players
Rugby union players from Wellington City
Wellington rugby union players
Melbourne Rebels players
Rugby union fullbacks
New Zealand expatriate rugby union players
Expatriate rugby union players in Australia
Expatriate rugby union players in England
New Zealand expatriate sportspeople in Australia
New Zealand expatriate sportspeople in England
Hurricanes (rugby union) players
People educated at St. Patrick's College, Silverstream
Bristol Bears players
Gloucester Rugby players